is an anime television series produced by Lay-duce. It is based on the song "Heroine Tarumono!", which is part of the Kokuhaku Jikkō Iinkai: Ren'ai Series Vocaloid song project by HoneyWorks. The series aired from April to June 2022.

Synopsis 
After leaving her rural hometown to pursue a career in track & field by enrolling in Tokyo's Sakuragaoka High School, Hiyori Suzumi becomes manager-in-training for the high school idol duo LIP×LIP, who happen to be her classmates. Hijinks ensue as she tries to balance track, schoolwork, making new friends, and working in secret to manage LIP×LIP.

Characters

A first-year student and a newcomer to Tokyo. She transferred there from the countryside in order to pursue track and field. She becomes an apprentice manager to LIP×LIP after she met them during her first day at school.

A first-year student and Hiyori's classmate and friend. She is a gyaru.

A first-year student and Hiyori's classmate. She is a big fan of LIP×LIP and at one point became jealous of Hiyori after discovering she had become close to them.

Full Throttle4
YUI

RIO

MEGU

DAI

IV

Production and release
The anime project was announced on August 28, 2021. It is produced by Lay-duce and directed by Noriko Hashimoto, with Yoshimi Narita overseeing the series' scripts, Kaori Ishii designing the characters and serving as chief animation director, and Moe Hyūga composing the music. The series aired from April 7 to June 23, 2022, on Tokyo MX, BS Fuji, MBS, and AT-X. The opening theme song is "Julietta" by the in-story group LIP×LIP, while the ending theme song is "Tokyo Sunny Party" by Inori Minase, Ayane Sakura, and Saori Hayami. Crunchyroll has licensed the series.

On April 11, 2022, Crunchyroll announced that the series would receive an English dub, which premiered on April 21 and is produced by the in-house cast in Texas.

Episode list

Notes

References

External links
 

2022 anime television series debuts
Anime with original screenplays
Crunchyroll anime
Lay-duce